Eynesbury Hardwicke is a former civil parish, now in the parishes of Abbotsley and St Neots, in the Huntingdonshire part of Cambridgeshire, England. At the time of the 2001 census, the parish had a population of 1,124.

Eynesbury Hardwicke was historically part of Eynesbury parish. That parish was split in two on 1 April 1895; the village of Eynesbury was incorporated into the town of St Neots. Eynesbury Hardwicke parish was formed from the remaining 2,641 acres (10.7 km2) of countryside.

Caldecote Manor, Eynesbury Hardwicke House and the site of an abandoned village, Weald, are in the former parish. It did not contain a parish church or settlement—though by the time of its dissolution Eynesbury had expanded into the parish—but it did have a parish council.

The civil parish was abolished on 1 April 2010 and the area divided between Abbotsley and St Neots.

References

Huntingdonshire
Former civil parishes in Cambridgeshire
St Neots